Zhejiang A & F University (ZAFU), formerly referred to as Zhejiang Agriculture and Forestry University, is a provincial university established in 1958. It is in Lin'an District, Hangzhou, capital of Zhejiang province in China.

History 
Zhejiang A & F University (ZAFU) was created in 1958. It is a provincial university that offers undergraduate and postgraduate degrees in agriculture, science, technology, literature, commerce, law, economics and medicine.

Administration

Administrative offices 
The administrative offices are structured into the following divisions:
Teaching Affairs Office
Center of Equipment Purchase and Management
Department of Science and Technology Administration
Graduate Department
Student Affairs Department
Admissions and Career Service Office
Capital Construction Department
Department of University Rear Service Administration
Supervision and Auditing Office
International Office
Public Security Department
Center of Modern Educational Technology
Center of Educational Development
Headquarters of New Campus Construction
University Rear Service Corp.

Schools and departments 
The university is organized into the following schools and departments.
School of Agriculture and Food Science
School of Forestry and Biotechnology
School of Environmental Technology
School of Animal Science and Technology
School of Engineering
School of Landscape Architecture
School of Economics and Management
School of Humanities
School of Information Science and Technology
School of Foreign Languages
School of Tourism and Health
School of Tea Culture
School of Sciences
School of Art Design
International College
Continuing Education College
Division of Physical Education and Military Training

School scenery

References

External links
Zhejiang A & F University Official website

Universities and colleges in Zhejiang
Educational institutions established in 1958
Forestry in China
1958 establishments in China